Sierra Grande is a city and municipality in the San Antonio Department of Río Negro Province in Argentina. It was founded in 1903, and as of the  it counted with a population of 7,641.

The lands where the city now stands was once Tehuelche territory. The first white settlers came from Viedma and Carmen de Patagones; they established a small settlement with the name of Sierra Vieja, later renamed as Colonia Chilavert. On 19 October 1903, the first juez de paz took seat in the settlement, and this is now celebrated as the town's foundational moment. The discovery of iron ore in the region led to the town's growth in the 1940s.

References

External links
 

Populated places in Río Negro Province
Populated places established in 1903
1903 establishments in Argentina
Cities in Argentina
Argentina
Río Negro Province